Give It 2 'Em Raw is the debut studio album by  American rapper Soulja Slim, released on  May 19, 1998 on No Limit Records and Priority. It is widely considered one of No Limit’s greatest albums. The album was a success, debuting at  number 13 on the Billboard 200. It also debuted at number 4 on the Top R&B/Hip-Hop Albums.

Commercial performance
The album debuted at number 13 on the Billboard 200 chart, with first-week sales of 82,000 copies in the United States. Tapp was serving time in prison as a result of a violation of his probation shortly after the release of this album.

Track listing

Charts

Weekly charts

Year-end charts

References

Soulja Slim albums
1998 debut albums
No Limit Records albums